Guairá Falls were a series of immense waterfalls on the Paraná River along the border between Paraguay and Brazil. The falls ceased to exist in 1982 when they were inundated by the impoundment of the Itaipu Dam reservoir.

The falls comprised 18 cataracts clustered in seven groups—hence their Portuguese name, Sete Quedas (Seven Falls)—near the Brazilian municipality of Guaíra, Paraná and Salto de Guairá, the easternmost city in Paraguay. The falls were located at a point where the Paraná River was forced through a narrow gorge.

Submergence

A tourist attraction and a favorite of locals, the falls were completely submerged under the artificial lake created by the Itaipu Dam upon its completion in 1982. The building of the dam, authorized by a 1973 bilateral agreement between the Paraguayan and Brazilian regimes of the time, marked a new era of cooperation between the countries, both of which had claimed ownership of Guaíra Falls.

As construction of the Itaipu Dam progressed, thousands of visitors flocked to the area to see the falls before they disappeared forever. Disaster struck on January 17, 1982, when a suspended footbridge affording access to a particularly spectacular view of the falls collapsed, killing dozens of tourists.

Brazilian poet Carlos Drummond de Andrade wrote a poem expressing his dismay at the destruction of Guaíra Falls. Set in large type, the poem filled an entire page in the Jornal do Brasil newspaper:Here seven visions, seven liquid sculpturesvanished through the computerized calculationsof a country ceasing to be humanin order to become a chilly corporation, nothing more.A movement becomes a dam.—Carlos Drummond de Andrade, "Farewell to Seven Falls" (excerpt, translated from the Portuguese)

Earlier, as the waters began to rise, a demonstration took place, as hundreds of people gathered to participate in a guarup, an indigenous ritual in memory of the falls. The inundation took only 14 days, occurring during the rainy season when the level of the Paraná River was high. By October 27, 1982, the reservoir was fully formed and the falls had vanished, with only part of the rock face visible during years of drought.

The director of the company that built the dam was quoted as saying, "We're not destroying Seven Falls. We're just going to transfer it to Itaipu Dam, whose spillway will be a substitute for [the falls'] beauty".

See also
List of waterfalls by flow rate

References

Sources
 Brazil, Lonely Planet Guide, 4th Edition, c. 1998 Lonely Planet Publications, PO Box 617, Hawthorn, Victoria 3122, Australia

External links
A new gateway to the heart of South America, 1918 by William Alfred Reid
Salto de Sete Quedas photoset
Salto de Sete Quedas - Brasil, December 1978 by Mario Cesar Mendonça Gomes
Salto de Sete Quedas - Brasil, December 1978 by Mario Cesar Mendonça Gomes

Waterfalls of Brazil
Waterfalls of Paraguay
Submerged waterfalls
Brazil–Paraguay border
Paraná River
Canindeyú Department
Landforms of Paraná (state)